Elections are held in Evansville, Indiana to elect the city's mayor. Currently, such elections are regularly scheduled to be held every four years, in the year immediately preceding that of United States presidential elections.

Elections before 1934

1934

The 1934 Evansville, Indiana mayoral election saw the election of  Democratic nominee William H. Dress.

1937

The 1937 Evansville, Indiana mayoral election saw the reelection of  Democratic incumbent William H. Dress.

1942

The 1942 Evansville, Indiana mayoral election saw the election of  Republican nominee Mason Reichert, unseating Democratic incumbent William H. Dress.

1947

The 1947 Evansville, Indiana mayoral election was held on November 4, 1947, and saw the election of Democrat William H. Dress returned to office for a third nonconsecutive term, unseating Republican incumbent Manson Reichert. Dress was only the second individual in the city's history to win three mayoral elections.

Due to a change in state election law after the previous election, the election was moved to 1947. As a result, the preceding term of incumbent Reichert was extended to 1948, giving him an unprecedented five-year term as mayor before this election.

1951

The 1951 Evansville, Indiana mayoral election was held on November 6, 1951, and saw the election of  Republican nominee Henry O. Roberts. Roberts defeated Democratic incumbent Edwin F. Diekmann, who had been appointed as mayor following the November 1949 death in office of William H. Dress.

1955

The 1955 Evansville, Indiana mayoral election was held on November 8, 1955, and saw the election of  Democratic nominee Vance Hartke.

Hartke, the chairman of the Vanderburgh County Democratic Party organization, had faced city recreation director James R. Newcom in the Democratic primary election. The primary was competitive.

In early June, during the general election, thirteen supporters of Hartke's vanquished primary election opponent, Newcom, filed a complaint under Indiana's Corrupt Practices Act of 1945. The complaint related to $8,000 that had been raised by a Jefferson–Jackson Day dinner, which these supporters of Newcom alleged was used to assist Hartke's candidacy, but should instead have been used to assist the Democratic Party in general. The lawsuit alleged that Hartke's campaign manager, Sheriff Frank McDonald, had therefore misused the proceeds from the dinner banquet. The lawsuit was dismissed in late August, after the plaintiffs refused to post a $500 cost bond.

Republican nominee Curtis Huber was a real estate man, who found himself in conflict with the local county Republican Party organization.

The general election campaign between Hartke and Huber was considered to be one of the harshest up to that point in the city's history.

In the coinciding city council election, Hartke's Democratic Party won seven seats, capturing all but two seats (with those two seats coming from wards that were considered to be overwhelmingly Republican-leaning ). The Democratic nominee also won the city clerk race and a race for city judge. At the time, Vanderburgh County (which had voted for the national winner of every previous United States presidential election going back to 1892) was regarded as a political barometer, thus, attention was paid to the Democratic Party landslide in Evansville, the county seat of Vanderburgh County. Ultimately, however, Vanderburgh County, and the nation, would end up voting for the Republican ticket in the subsequent 1956 United States presidential election.

1959

The 1959 Evansville, Indiana mayoral election was held on November 3, 1959, and saw the election of  Democratic nominee Frank F. McDonald.

1963

The 1963 Evansville, Indiana mayoral election was held on November 5, 1963, and saw the reelection of Democratic incumbent Frank F. McDonald. He defeated former mayor Henry O. Roberts, the Republican nominee.

1967

The 1967 Evansville, Indiana mayoral election was held on November 7, 1967, and saw the reelection of Democratic incumbent Frank F. McDonald to a third consecutive term. This made him the first mayor to win a third consecutive term in the city's history.

Primaries
In the May 2 primary elections, incumbent mayor Frank F. McDonald ran unopposed in the Democratic primary, and John Lavens ran unopposed in the Republican primary.

General election

1971

The 1971 Evansville, Indiana mayoral election was held on November 2, 1971, and saw the election of Republican nominee Russell G. Lloyd Sr.

Incumbent Democrat Frank F. McDonald did not seek reelection to what would have been a fifth term.

Primaries
Primary elections were held on May 4.

Democratic primary
City Council president William L. Brooks defeated William Arendell, a former coroner, in the Democratic Party primary. Brooks had boasted the endorsement of outgoing mayor Frank F. McDonald, and was considered the front-runner in the primary.

Republican primary
Russell G. Lloyd Sr. won the Republican Party primary against a single opponent. Lloyd entered the primary with the support of the local Republican organization.

General election
At 70%, turnout was considered to be high.

Lloyd's victory, with a 9,158, was considered impressive and surpisingly large. His victory came amid a bad municipal election year for Indiana's Republican Party. Along with the Indianapolis mayoral election, Evansville's election marked one of only two Republican mayoral victories in the state's larger municipal areas with Democrats winning the elections in East Chicago, Fort Wayne, Gary, Hammond, South Bend, and Terre Haute.

In the coinciding city council election, Republicans won 8 seats, and Democrats won one.

The strong Democratic performance came despite outgoing mayor McDonald having been seen, prior to the election, as having established one of the strong city and county Democratic organizations in the state.

1975

The 1975 Evansville, Indiana mayoral election was held on November 4, 1975, and saw the reelection of Republican incumbent Russell G. Lloyd Sr.

Primaries
Primary elections were held on May 6.

Democratic primary
The Democratic primary was won the Indiana state representative J. Jeff Hays. The Democratic primary was largely predicted to be a toss-up between Hays and Jerry Linzy, the director of development for the University of Evansville. The third candidate was city sewage department employee Jack Roll.

Republican primary
The Republican primary was won by incumbent mayor Russell G. Lloyd Sr., who was unopposed in the primary.

General election
Lloyd became the first Republican mayor to win reelection in Evansville since 1895.

1979

The 1979 Evansville, Indiana mayoral election was held on November 6, 1979, and saw the election of Democratic nominee Michael Vandeveer.

Incumbent Republican mayor Russell G. Lloyd Sr., frustrated by tax and spending controls imposed by the state, did not seek reelection to a third term.

Primaries
Primary elections were held on May 8.

Democratic primary
City councilman Michael Vandeveer won the  Democratic primary. Vandeveer defeated Vanderburgh County assessor James Angermeier. Vandeveer was considered the front-runner in the primary.

Republican primary
Randall T. Shepard, an administrative assistant to incumbent Republican mayor Russell G. Lloyd Sr., won the Republican primary. Lloyd defeated Bradley Ten Barge, a musician and retail worker. Shephard was the frontrunner for the nomination, and had been endorsed by the local Republican Party organization's slating committee.

General election
Ahead of election day, race was considered one of the most competitive mayoral races in the state of Indiana that year.

1983

The 1983 Evansville, Indiana mayoral election was held on November 8, 1983, and saw the reelection of Democratic incumbent Michael Vandeveer.

Primaries
Primary elections were held on May 3.

Democratic primary
Incumbent mayor Michael Vandeveer faced token opposition from two challengers. While neither opponent were seen as posing a strong challenge to Vandeveer, more serious of the two candidates running against Vandeveer in the primary was Berta Hammerseen, a former university professor and former member of the Evansville Housing Authority. Hammerstein criticized Vandeveer for the financial troubles of the city, and for shortcomings in regards to economic development in the city. Mark R. Chellgren of the Associated Press wrote shortly before the day of the primary, "the tone of her attacks has put off some party regulars, who give her little chance to unseat Vandeveer". Vandeveer's other challenger was Larry Williams, who did not do much in regards to campaigning.

Republican primary
Four-term city councilman and high school teacher David Koehler won the Republican nomination. Running against him in the Republican primary was and former two-term Vanderburgh County sheriff James DeGroote.

Koehler had the backing of the local Republican Party organization, which provided his campaign with organizational and financial support. DeGroote dedicated himself as a full-time campaigner.

Both candidates argued that economic development should be the first priority of Evansville's mayor. The campaign between them was not focused on issues, but rather on personality. Also effecting the race was debate over the influence of the county Republican chairman, Bob Whitehouse.

Koehler worked to soften his public image. Despite being seen as a good manager, Mark R. Chellgren of the Associated Press wrote that he was seen as having, "little regard for the people side of government".

DeGroote ran, in large part, on both his record as sheriff, and on presenting himself with a friendly image.

General election
Early into the campaign, the Republican Party had hopes that its nominee might be able to unseat Vendeveer. However, Koehler's candidacy failed to create momentum.

Koehler alleged that Vandeveer was guilty of "fiscal mismanagement", often pointing to a financial crisis that the city government had faced in 1981. Koehler also accused Vandeveer of subjecting residents to too many new fees, while also alleging that Vandeveer did not make the best use of the revenues generated by these fees. Koehler also attacked Vandeveer for his shortcomings in attracting economic development.

Vandeveer insisted that the city's economic issues were largely attributable to the ongoing early 1980s recession, and predicted that the city would see improved economic fortunes by the end of the decade.

Both nominees were in agreement that the state of Indiana should pass legislation to establish a new local option income tax, as well as provide additional new methods for city's such as Evansville to generate more revenue.

1987

The 1987 Evansville, Indiana mayoral election was held on November 3, 1987, and saw the reelection of Democratic incumbent Frank F. McDonald II, a city councilman who had been serving as interim mayor since May (having been appointed interim mayor on May 23, 1987, by the city council after mayor Michael Vandeveer resigned in order to accept a lobbyist job).

Primaries
Primary elections were held on May 5.

Democratic primary
Days before announcing his plans to resign, incumbent Michael Vandeveer was renominated by his party. He had been unopposed for the nomination. After Vanderveer announced his resignation, Frank F. McDonald II was selected by Democratic leaders to fill his place. McDonald was also appointed by the city council to serve as interim mayor until the winner of the election would take office.

Republican primary
Al Folz won the Republican nomination.

General election
Folz was seen as running too weak of a campaign organization to stand a strong chance at winning the Democratic-leaning city.

1991

The 1991 Evansville, Indiana mayoral election was held on November 5, 1991, and saw the reelection of Democratic incumbent Frank F. McDonald II.

Primaries
Primary elections were held on May 8.

Democratic primary
Incumbent mayor Frank F. McDonald II won renomination unopposed.

Republican primary

General election

1995

The 1995 Evansville, Indiana mayoral election was held on November 7, 1995, and saw the reelection of Democratic incumbent Frank McDonald II.

Primaries 
Primary elections were held on May 2.

Democratic primary 
Incumbent Frank McDonald II was renominated, defeating challengers Frank Fuquay and Kerry Longest.

Republican primary 
Business owner Lori Frary won the Republican nomination over David Coker, Jack Groshands, and Doug DeGroot.

General election
The election was considered a low-key race. Discussion largely centered upon the city's upcoming riverboat casino, which would open the month after the election.

1999

The 1999 Evansville, Indiana mayoral election was held on November 2, 1999, and saw the election of Republican nominee Russell G. Lloyd Jr.

Incumbent Democrat Frank F. McDonald II did not seek reelection.

Nominations

Democratic primary

Republican primary

General election

2003

The 2003 Evansville, Indiana mayoral election was held on November 4, 2003, and saw the election of Democratic nominee Jonathan Weinzapfel, who unseated incumbent Republican mayor Russell G. Lloyd Jr.

Nominations

Democratic primary

Republican primary
Incumbent Russell G. Lloyd was challenged by Douglas DeGroot, who ran a frugal campaign. DeGroot's performance in the vote was regarded as surprisingly strong.

Independent candidates
Jack Groshans, Jr. ran as an independent candidate.

General election
Weinzapfel defeated Lloyd.

2003 was a good year for Democrats in Indiana's mayoral elections, with the party winning control of the mayoralties of all of the state's top seven most populous cities for the first time since 1959. The Democratic Party also won control of the mayoralties in twenty of the state's thirty cities with populations above 25,000. Additionally, in 2003, Democrats won more than 56% of partisan mayoral races in Indiana.

During the general election, Vanderburgh County, where Evansville is located, saw voter turnout of 25% in its various elections.

2007

The 2007 Evansville, Indiana mayoral election was held on November 6, 2007, and saw the reelection of Democratic incumbent Jonathan Weinzapfel.

Nominations
Primary elections were held May 8.

During the primary elections, the voter turnout in Vanderburgh County, in which Evansville is located, was 6.12%.

Democratic primary

Republican primary

General election
Voter turnout in Vanderburgh County during the November elections was 19.42%.

2011

The 2011 Evansville, Indiana mayoral election was held on November 8, 2011, and saw the election of Rerpublican nominee Lloyd Winnecke.'

Incumbent Democrat Jonathan Weinzapfel did not seek reelection.

Nominations
Primary elections were held May 3.

During the primary elections, the voter turnout in Vanderburgh County, in which Evansville is located, was 10.06%.

Democratic primary

Republican primary
Businessman Lloyd Winnecke defeated Douglas De Groot. De Groot had previously been a candidate in the 2003 Evansville Republican mayoral primary.

General election
Voter turnout in Evansville for the municipal general election was 23.64%.

2015

The 2015 Evansville, Indiana mayoral election was held on November 3, 2015, and saw the reelection of Republican Lloyd Winnecke.

Nominations
Primary elections were held May 5.
During the primary elections, turnout in Vanderburgh County, in which Evansville is located, was 6.76%.

Democratic primary

Republican primary

Independent candidates
Steve "Woz" Wozniak ran as an independent candidate.

General election
During the general election, turnout in Vanderburgh County, in which Evansville is located, was 20.70%.

2019

The 2019 Evansville, Indiana mayoral election was held on November 5, 2019, and saw the reelection of Republican Lloyd Winnecke to a third consecutive term.

Nominations
Primary elections were held May 7.

Democratic primary
No candidate ran for the Democratic Party nomination.

For the first time in at least 85 years, the Democratic Party failed to field a candidate in an Evansville mayoral election.

Candidates

Declined to run
Ryan Hatfield, state representative
Ben Shoulders, Vanderburgh County Commissioner
Jonathan Weaver, City Councilman

Libertarian nomination
Bart Gadau was nominated by the Libertarian Party.

Republican primary

Independent candidates
Steve Ary ran as an independent candidate.

General election
During the general election, turnout in Vanderburgh County, in which Evansville is located, was 19.94%.

Winnecke became the fourth mayor of Evansville to be elected to a third term.

2023

The 2023 Evansville, Indiana mayoral election will be held in 2023. Incumbent mayor Lloyd Winnecke is not running for re-election to a fourth term in office.

Republican primary

Declared
Cheryl Musgrave, Vanderburgh County commissioner and former Vanderburgh County Assessor
Natalie Rascher, talent acquisition professional and member of the Vanderburgh County Alcohol Beverage Commission

Disqualified
Caine Helmer, store greeter

Withdrew
Gabe Whitley, lobbyist

Declined
Justin Elpers, city councilor
Steve Schaefer, deputy mayor
Lloyd Winnecke, incumbent mayor (endorsed Rascher)

Endorsements

Democratic primary

Declared
Stephanie Terry, Vanderburgh County councilor and executive director of the Children's Museum of Evansville

Disqualified
Brian Alexander, advertising planner

Declined
Alex Burton, city councilor
Ryan Hatfield, Indiana state representative
Missy Mosby, city councilor
Phil Smith, Vanderburgh County assistant police chief
Jonathan Weaver, at-large city councilor

Endorsements

References